Boquerón State Forest (Spanish: Bosque Estatal de Boquerón) is one of the 20 forestry units that make up the public forest system of Puerto Rico. Despite its name, the Boquerón State Forest is not only located in Boquerón, Cabo Rojo but also spans almost 5,000 acres across the municipalities of Cabo Rojo, Lajas and Mayagüez. The forest area is also known for its limestone cliffs, the lighthouse, and the salt flats which have been a source of salt since the pre-Hispanic era and dating to 700 C.E. it is considered one of the oldest industries in the Americas.

History 
Boquerón State Forest is one of the oldest forests in the Puerto Rico state forest system. It was proclaimed and designated a forest preserve in 1918 by Puerto Rico governor Arthur Yager with the purpose of preserving the mangrove biomes in Cabo Rojo and Lajas. Two additional segments, the Guayacán and Cuevas Keys, were added in 1943. The areas of the Molino mangroves, Los Morrillos (famous for its lighthouse) and the Guaniquilla Lagoon and surrounding mangroves were annexed to the Boquerón State Forest in 1980. 

The state forest today is managed by the Puerto Rico Department of Natural and Environmental Resources and extends across 9 management segments across three municipalities:

 Mangrove forest of Guanajibo, Mayagüez.
 Joyuda Lagoon and mangroves in Joyuda, Cabo Rojo.
 Puerto Real mangrove forest in Miradero, Cabo Rojo.
 Boquerón mangrove forests in Cabo Rojo.
 Cabo Rojo National Wildlife Refuge in Llanos Costa, Cabo Rojo.
 Las Salinas de Cabo Rojo (the salt flats) and adjacent mangrove forests in Llanos Costa, Cabo Rojo.
 Molino mangrove forest in Llanos Costa, Cabo Rojo.
 Pitahaya mangrove forest in Llanos Costa, Cabo Rojo.
 Bahía Montalva mangrove forest in Costa, Lajas.

Geology 
The forest is located in the Puerto Rico southern karst region and as such all of its geological formations contain limestone, particularly the Ponce limestone. It is often said that the reddish-colored limestone is what gives its name to the municipality and city of Cabo Rojo (Spanish for "red cape").

Ecology 

The Boquerón Forest is ecologically important and it hosts several marine biomes in addition to the mangrove forests such as coral reefs and seagrass meadows which are important to threatened species such as the West Indian manatee. 

All four species of mangrove are found within the forest, in addition to important indicator plant species such as the bullet tree (Terminalia buceras), the greenheart (Colubrina arborenscens) and the sea grape (Coccoloba uvifera). The endangered black cóbana (Libidibia monosperma) and the critically endangered bariaco (Trichilia triacantha) are also found and preserved in the forest. 

The beaches around the forest are important sea turtle nesting sites, particularly for the leatherback sea turtle (Dermochelys coriacea), the hawksbill sea turtle (Eretmochelys imbricada) and the green sea turtle (Chelonia mydas). Additionally, the forest serves as one of the few habitats in the world where the endangered yellow-shouldered blackbird (Yellow-shouldered blackbird) can be found.

Recreation 
The forest's main offices are located in Poblado de Boquerón, Cabo Rojo. Tours are available for large groups but must be reserved in anticipation by contacting the forest office at (787)-851-7260. The reserve offers opportunities for hiking, fishing, kayaking, biking, snorkeling and birdwatching. The area also contains numerous landmarks and tourist attractions such as the Los Morrillos Lighthouse, the salt flats, and the limestone cliffs and rock formations such as the Stone Bridge (Spanish: Puente de Piedra), and numerous beaches.

Gallery

See also 
 Boquerón, Cabo Rojo
 List of Puerto Rico state forests

References 

Puerto Rico state forests
Tourist attractions in Mayagüez, Puerto Rico
Mangroves
Karst formations
Cabo Rojo, Puerto Rico
Lajas, Puerto Rico
Mayagüez, Puerto Rico
1918 establishments in Puerto Rico
Protected areas established in 1918